Jalmari Helander (born 21 July 1976) is a Finnish screenwriter and film director. He is known for the 2010 film Rare Exports: A Christmas Tale (which Cate Blanchett named as one of her favorite movies) and the 2014 action-adventure Big Game starring Samuel L. Jackson. Before turning to feature films, Helander directed several short films and award-winning television commercials.


Filmography

Feature films
 Rare Exports: A Christmas Tale (2010)
 Big Game (2014)
 Sisu (2022)
 Jerry and Ms. Universe (TBA)

Short films
 Iceman (1999)
 Maximillian Tarzan (1999)
 Ukkonen (2001)
 Rare Exports Inc. (2003)
 The Official Rare Exports Inc. Safety Instructions (2005)
 The Fakir (2006)

TV Series
 Perfect Commando (2020–)

See also
Finnish cinema

References

External links

1976 births
Finnish film directors
Finnish screenwriters   
Living people
Sámi people
Writers from Helsinki